The 2017 West Texas A&M Buffaloes football team representedWest Texas A&M University in the 2017 NCAA Division II football season. They were led by first-year head coach Hunter Hughes. The Buffaloes played their home games at Kimbrough Memorial Stadium and were members of the Lone Star Conference.

Schedule
West Texas A&M announced its 2017 football schedule on January 5, 2017. The schedule consists of seven home and four away games in the regular season. The Buffaloes will host LSC foes Eastern New Mexico, Texas-Permian Basin, Texas A&M-Commerce, and Western New Mexico and will travel to Angelo State, Midwestern State, Tarleton State, Texas A&M-Kingsville.

The Buffaloes will host all three non-conference games against Adams State from the Rocky Mountain Athletic Conference (RMAC), Azusa Pacific from the Pacific West Conference and Colorado State-Pueblo also from the RMAC.

Rankings

References

West Texas AandM
West Texas A&M Buffaloes football seasons
West Texas AandM Buffaloes football